Firsov is a Russian masculine surname, its feminine counterpart is Firsova. It may refer to

Alissa Firsova (born 1986), Russian-British classical composer, pianist and conductor
Anatoli Firsov (1941–2000), Russian ice hockey player
Elena Firsova (born 1950), Russian composer
Ivan Firsov (c.1733–1785), Russian painter
Oleg Firsov (1915–1998), Russian physicist
Olga Firsova (born 1976), Russian basketball player
Philip Firsov (born 1985), British painter and sculptor
Vadim Firsov (born 1978), Russian football player

See also
Firsov (crater) on the far side of the Moon

Russian-language surnames